Sakharayapatna  is a village in the southern state of Karnataka, India. It is located in the Kadur taluk of Chikkamagaluru district in Karnataka.

Demographics
As of 2001 India census, Sakrepatna had a population of 5550 with 2808 males and 2742 females.

See also
 Chikmagalur
 Districts of Karnataka

References

External links
 http://Chikmagalur.nic.in/

Villages in Chikkamagaluru district